|}

This is a list of electoral district results for the Victorian 1947 election.

Results by electoral district

Albert Park

Allandale

Ballarat

Barwon

Benalla

Benambra

Bendigo 

 Preferences were not distributed.

Borung

Box Hill

Brighton

Brunswick

Camberwell

Carlton

Caulfield

Clifton Hill

Coburg

Collingwood

Dandenong

Dundas

Elsternwick

Essendon

Evelyn 

 Preferences were not distributed.

Footscray

Geelong

Gippsland East

Gippsland North

Gippsland South

Gippsland West

Glen Iris

Goulburn

Grant

Hampden

Hawthorn 

 Preferences were not distributed.

Ivanhoe 

 Preferences were not distributed.

Kew

Korong

Malvern 

 Preferences were not distributed.

Melbourne

Mentone

Mernda

Midlands

Mildura

Moonee Ponds

Mornington 

 Preferences were not distributed.

Murray Valley

Northcote

Oakleigh

Polwarth

Portland

Port Melbourne 

 Preferences were not distributed.

Prahran

Preston

Rainbow

Richmond

Ripon

Rodney

Scoresby

Shepparton

St Kilda

Sunshine

Swan Hill 

 Preferences were not distributed.

Toorak 

 Preferences were not distributed.

Warrnambool

Williamstown 

 Preferences were not distributed.

Wonthaggi

See also 

 1947 Victorian state election
 Members of the Victorian Legislative Assembly, 1947–1950

References 

Results of Victorian state elections
1940s in Victoria (Australia)